Streptomyces dengpaensis is a bacterium species from the genus of Streptomyces which has been isolated from desert soil from the Dengpa District in Tibet.

See also 
 List of Streptomyces species

References 

dengpaensis
Bacteria described in 2018